Peripatopsis capensis is a species of velvet worm in the Peripatopsidae family. This species has 18 pairs of legs: 17 pregenital leg pairs with claws plus one strongly reduced last pair without claws or spinous pads. Females of this species range from 9 mm to 70 mm in length, whereas males range from 6 mm to 54 mm. The native range of this species is limited to the Cape Peninsula of South Africa.

Introduced distribution 
Outside of its native range in South Africa, this species has also been found on Santa Cruz Island in the Galapagos Islands, thought to be an accidental human-mediated introduction. Santa Cruz Island also has one or more native species of velvet worms in the family Peripatidae.</ref>

References

Further reading 
 
 

Endemic fauna of South Africa
Onychophorans of temperate Africa
Onychophoran species
Animals described in 1866
Taxa named by Adolph Eduard Grube